Alexander Benard is an American private equity investor and lawyer.

Early life and education
Benard grew up in the U.S. and in Austria.  He holds a BA from Claremont McKenna College and a JD from Stanford Law School.

Career
Benard is a Senior Managing Director at Cerberus Capital Management, where he serves as Co-Head of Frontier Markets. Prior to that he was Managing Partner of SGI Frontier Capital, a private equity firm focused on frontier markets (which was acquired by Cerberus in 2018).  He used to be managing director of Gryphon Partners, a consulting and investment firm focused on the Middle East and Central Asia.  Prior to that, he was a corporate lawyer at Cleary Gottlieb Steen & Hamilton LLP, an international law firm, where he focused on cross-border transactions.

He has written columns on U.S. foreign policy, domestic policy, and investing in emerging and frontier markets for Foreign Affairs, The Wall Street Journal, the National Review, World Affairs, the New York Post, Forbes, Policy Review, the Journal of Strategic Studies, Foreign Policy Digest, Foreign Policy, and World Politics Review.  Many of his writings have centered around commercial diplomacy, and U.S.-China competition for strategic assets.  This includes a piece in Foreign Affairs in 2012 about strategic ports and resources across Asia and Africa.  He has also spoken about frontier markets at numerous conferences including the annual BCA Conference and the IFC/EMPEA Global Private Equity Conference.

Benard has appeared on CNN's No Bias, No Bull with Campbell Brown.

He has worked at the Washington Institute for Near East Policy, the House Foreign Affairs Committee, and the Department of Defense.  He has also worked in the office of Senator Chuck Hagel.

Benard has conducted research for books written by two prominent foreign policy scholars: Larry Diamond's The Spirit of Democracy: The Struggle to Build Free Societies Throughout the World; and Dennis Ross's The Missing Peace: The Inside Story of the Fight for Middle East Peace.

He has been awarded several fellowships, including the Claremont Institute Publius Fellowship, the Freedom House Religious Freedom Fellowship, and the Foreign Policy Association John C. Whitehead Fellowship.  He has also been named a Future Leader in Foreign Policy by the Foreign Policy Initiative and was also named to the Diplomatic Courier's Top 99 Under 33. He was a visiting fellow at the Hoover Institution and is an Adjunct Fellow at the Hudson Institute.

Personal
Alexander Benard is the son of Zalmay Khalilzad and Cheryl Benard.  Zalmay Khalilzad is an Afghan American foreign policy scholar and diplomat who most recently served as U.S. ambassador to the United Nations.  Cheryl Benard is an author and political scientist at the RAND Corporation and the founder of the Bamiyan Project, a non-profit organization seeking to rebuild the Bamiyan Buddhas.

References

External links
"How to Succeed in Business", Benard in Foreign Affairs.
"Preserving a Powerful Weapon Against Terror", Benard in The Wall Street Journal.
"Engage Iran on Human Rights", Benard in The Wall Street Journal.
"How to Handle a Tyrant", Benard in the National Review.
"Democracy in Europe", Benard in the National Review.

American columnists
American political writers
American male non-fiction writers
Stanford Law School alumni
American lawyers
1983 births
Living people
Pashtun people
American people of Afghan descent
Claremont McKenna College alumni
People associated with Cleary Gottlieb Steen & Hamilton